Rafi' Dahham Mejwel Al-Hazza Al-Tikriti (24 April 1937 – 11 October 1999) was from the same subtribe of Saddam Hussein's, Member of the Iraqi Revolutionary Command Council, Director of the Iraqi Intelligence Service, the former Iraqi Ambassador to Turkey, and former Head of the Iraqi Secret Services, which is equivalent to the Federal Bureau of Investigation (FBI) of the United States when conducting domestic activities. He was one of the well known political figures in Iraq. The former Iraqi Government during Saddam Hussein era announced his official death date as 11 October 1999, whereupon he was buried in Tikrit, Salah ad Din, which is the home town of many senior members of the Iraqi government during the Saddam era.

List of directors
What follows is a list of Directors of the well known Iraqi Intelligence Service Directors.

References

External links
 Global Security Organization
 Intelligence Agency Duties

1937 births
1999 deaths
Iraqi writers
Government ministers of Iraq
Iraqi Sunni Muslims
Arab Socialist Ba'ath Party – Iraq Region politicians
Ambassadors of Iraq to Turkey